There are over 20,000 Grade II* listed buildings in England. This page is a list of these buildings in the district of Newcastle-under-Lyme in Staffordshire.

Newcastle-under-Lyme

|}

Notes

External links

 
Listed
Lists of Grade II* listed buildings in Staffordshire